Holmfirth was a parliamentary constituency centred on the town of Holmfirth in the West Riding of Yorkshire.  It returned one Member of Parliament (MP)  to the House of Commons of the Parliament of the United Kingdom, elected by the first past the post system.

History

The constituency was created by the Redistribution of Seats Act 1885 for the 1885 general election, and abolished for the 1918 general election.

Boundaries
Parts of the Sessional Divisions of Staincross and Upper Aggbrigg.

Members of Parliament

Elections

Elections in the 1880s

Elections in the 1890s

Elections in the 1900s

Elections in the 1910s 

General Election 1914–15:

A general election was due to take place by the end of 1915. By the autumn of 1914, the following candidates had been adopted to contest that election. Due to the outbreak of war, the election never took place.
Liberal:Sydney Arnold
Labour:William Lunn

References

Parliamentary constituencies in Yorkshire and the Humber (historic)
Constituencies of the Parliament of the United Kingdom established in 1885
Constituencies of the Parliament of the United Kingdom disestablished in 1918
Holmfirth
Politics of Kirklees